Elberta is a census-designated place (CDP) in Utah County, Utah, United States. It is part of the Provo–Orem Metropolitan Statistical Area. The population was 256 at the 2010 census. It was founded as Mt. Nebo. After the water failed in 1901, most of the early settlers moved away. It was purchased by Matthew B. Whitney, a native of New York, on November 7, 1907, and he renamed it "Elberta" after the peach cultivar.

Geography
Elberta is located near the center of Goshen Valley along U.S. Route 6, three miles west of Goshen.

Demographics

As of the census of 2000, there were 278 people, 56 households, and 53 families residing in the CDP. The population density was 20.1 people per square mile (7.7/km2). There were 58 housing units at an average density of 4.2/sq mi (1.6/km2). The racial makeup of the CDP was 80.22% White, 19.42% from other races, and 0.36% from two or more races. Hispanic or Latino of any race were 27.70% of the population.

There were 56 households, out of which 62.5% had children under the age of 18 living with them, 82.1% were married couples living together, 12.5% had a female householder with no husband present, and 3.6% were non-families. 3.6% of all households were made up of individuals, and none had someone living alone who was 65 years of age or older. The average household size was 4.27 and the average family size was 4.26.

In the CDP, the population was spread out, with 41.7% under the age of 18, 13.3% from 18 to 24, 24.8% from 25 to 44, 14.7% from 45 to 64, and 5.4% who were 65 years of age or older. The median age was 23 years. For every 100 females, there were 115.5 males. For every 100 females age 18 and over, there were 113.2 males.

The median income for a household in the CDP was $45,313, and the median income for a family was $45,313. Males had a median income of $26,250 versus $16,250 for females. The per capita income for the CDP was $9,356. None of the families and 12.9% of the population were living below the poverty line.

Transportation
Elberta is centered around the junction of what is now U.S. Route 6 (US-6) and Utah State Route 68 (SR-68). US-6 runs east-west through the south central part of the community, while SR-68 runs north from US-6 through the center of the community (and continues north through Utah and Salt Lake counties and into southern Davis County).

See also

 List of census-designated places in Utah

References

External links

Census-designated places in Utah
Census-designated places in Utah County, Utah
Provo–Orem metropolitan area
Populated places established in 1901